Wenquan is a town of Ruzhou City in western Henan province, China, located about  west of Ruzhou's city centre and along G36 Nanjing–Luoyang Expressway. , it has 28 villages under its administration.

See also 
List of township-level divisions of Henan

References 

Township-level divisions of Henan